Imperium Vorago the debut album by the progressive metal project Chimp Spanner. It was released in January 2005 independently. When Chimp Spanner signed to Basick Records, the album became available on the iTunes Store.

Track listing

Personnel
Chimp Spanner
 Paul Ortiz - guitars, bass, keyboards, drum programming, and production

External links
Chimp Spanner on Soundclick

2005 debut albums
Chimp Spanner albums